Phymatophaea is a genus of checkered beetles in the subfamily Enopliinae.

Species 
Phymatophaea aquila - Phymatophaea atrata - Phymatophaea auripila - Phymatophaea breviclava - Phymatophaea caledonia - Phymatophaea deirolinea - Phymatophaea earlyi - Phymatophaea enodis - Phymatophaea fuscitarsis - Phymatophaea guttigera - Phymatophaea hudsoni - Phymatophaea insula - Phymatophaea longula - Phymatophaea lugubris - Phymatophaea maorias - Phymatophaea oconnori - Phymatophaea opacula - Phymatophaea opiloides - Phymatophaea pustulifera - Phymatophaea testacea - Phymatophaea tracheloglaba - Phymatophaea watti - ?Phymatophaea aeraria - ?Phymatophaea pantomelas - ?Phymatophaea reductipennis

References

External links 
 
 

Enopliinae
Cleridae genera